"Last Night" is a song by American rapper Diddy that is a single featured on his fourth studio album, Press Play (2006).  The song features American singer-songwriter Keyshia Cole. The radio edit version of the song is featured on Cole's second studio album, Just like You (2007).

Part of the recording session was shown on Cole's reality show, Keyshia Cole: The Way It Is, on BET in July 2006. The making of the video was shown on BET's Access Granted on January 31, 2007.

Background
The song has an '80s-styled beat. The song samples the drumbeat of Prince's "Erotic City", but slightly modified to increase the bass. During BET's Access Granted, Diddy brought up the fact that Cole re-recorded her parts multiple times, and the two had many artistic differences on the song. The recording of the song was featured on Cole's reality show The Way It Is. On the UK radio version of the song, Diddy is heard talking on the phone only with the explicit words censored out at the end. The radio version of the song fades out before the phone dials, while the clean album version of the song still has this part only with the explicit words censored out.

Composition
"Last Night" is written in the key of E minor (recorded a half-step lower in E minor).  The song moves at a tempo of 121 beats per minute, and the vocals in the song span from B3 to D5.

Chart performance
"Last Night" peaked at number ten on the Hot 100, becoming his second top-ten hit off Press Play. The track was a moderate hit worldwide. "Last Night" managed to go top 20 in ten different countries. In the UK, "Last Night" only reached number 14, becoming his first single from Press Play not to hit the top ten.

Live performance
On June 26, 2007, Diddy performed "Last Night" at the 2007 BET Awards which featured Cole and Lil' Kim.

Formats and track listings
US 12" promotional single

Side A
"Last Night" [radio edit] 4:18
"Last Night" [mix show amended version] 6:26
Side B
"Last Night" [explicit version] 6:26
"Last Night" [clean] 6:26

UK Single
"Last Night" [radio edit] 4:18
"Tell Me" [DFA remix – radio edit] 4:06

Remixes
The official remix has two versions and has Cole on both of them; the first remix, the Dirty South Remix, features the Game, Big Boi, Yung Joc and Rich Boy, and the second remix, the NYC Remix, features Lil' Kim and Busta Rhymes. There is also a DJ Noodles remix that features Cole, T.I. and Pharrell Williams. A sequel of the song called "Last Night (Part 2)" can be found on the deluxe edition of Diddy's 2010 album, Last Train to Paris, with his group Dirty Money.

Charts and certifications

Weekly charts

Year-end charts

Certifications

References

2006 songs
2007 singles
Keyshia Cole songs
Sean Combs songs
Bad Boy Records singles
Songs written by Sean Combs
Songs written by Keyshia Cole
Music videos directed by Marc Webb
Songs written by Mario Winans
Songs written by Jack Knight (songwriter)
SNEP Top Singles number-one singles